The 2022 Indiana State Sycamores football team represent Indiana State University as a member of the Missouri Valley Football Conference (MVFC) during the 2022 NCAA Division I FCS football season. They are led fifth-year head coach Curt Mallory. The Sycamores play their home games at Memorial Stadium in Terre Haute, Indiana.

Previous season

The Sycamores finished the 2021 season with a record of 5–6, 3–5 MVFC play to finish in a tie for seventh place.

Schedule

Game summaries

North Alabama

at Purdue

No. 3 Montana

at Northern Iowa

No. 1 North Dakota State

at Youngstown State

Illinois State

at No. 1 South Dakota State

No. 21 North Dakota

at Western Illinois

Missouri State

References

Indiana State
Indiana State Sycamores football seasons
Indiana State Sycamores football